Zolmabad or Zalmabad may refer to:
 Zolmabad-e Olya, Kermanshah Province
 Zolmabad-e Sofla, Kermanshah Province
 Zolmabad, Khuzestan
 Zolmabad, Khoshab, Razavi Khorasan Province
 Zolmabad, Tehran
 Zolmabad-e Olya, Kermanshah Province
 Zolmabad-e Sofla, Kermanshah Province